The 2017–18 Mumbai City FC season was the club's fourth season since its establishment in 2014 and their fourth season in the Indian Super League.

Background

Mumbai City FC finished first in the standings at the end of the 2016 ISL league stage, thus qualifying for the semifinals for the very first time led by Diego Forlán who was their marquee player. However they lost in the semifinals to Atlético de Kolkata 3–2 on aggregate. Coach Alexandre Guimarães was thus retained for his 2nd term in-charge as the head coach of the club.

Transfers

Due to the Indian Super League regulation each club was allowed to retain a maximum of two Indian players over the age of twenty-one (21) from previous squad. On 1 July, Mumbai City announced they are retaining goalkeeper Amrinder Singh. Franchise announced retention of defensive midfielder Sehnaj Singh on 7 July. It was officially announced on 24 July that midfielder Rakesh Oram was retained by Mumbai City as U21 player.

In ISL players draft held on 23 July 2017, Mumbai City picked defender Aiborlang Khongjee who was loaned out to the franchise by Shillong Lajong in previous season. Mumbai City added eleven new players from draft, goalkeeper Arindam Bhattacharya and Kunal Sawant, defender Biswajit Saha, Mehrajuddin Wadoo and Lalchhawnkima, midfielder Abhinas Ruidas, Sahil Tavora, Sanju Pradhan and Zakeer Mundampara and forward Balwant Singh and Pranjal Bhumij. Defender Raju Gaikwad made his return who was previously part of Mumbai City squad in 2014 season.

Four players from Mumbai City were signed by other franchises in the draft. Goalkeeper Albino Gomes and left back Sena Ralte were signed by Delhi Dynamos. Right back Ashutosh Mehta was signed by ATK. Right winger Jackichand Singh was signed by Kerala Blasters.

Mumbai City announced re-signing of Romanian central back Lucian Goian on 26 July. Retention of Brazilian central back Gerson Vieira was announced on 27 July. On 3 August, franchise announced signing of Brazilian forward Éverton Santos. On 4 August, Mumbai City announced signing of Spanish striker Rafa Jordà. Retention of Brazilian midfielder Léo Costa was announced on 7 August. On 8 August, signing of Brazilian central back Márcio Rosário was announced. Signing of Indian U23 international Davinder Singh was announced on 17 August by the franchise. Mumbai City announced signing of Cameroonian midfielder Achille Emaná on 31 August 2017. On 3 September, Mumbai City announced signing of Brazilian midfielder Thiago Santos on a season long deal from Flamengo.

On 15 February 2018, the club announced that Lalchhawnkima will be joining Aizawl for the remainder of the season on loan.

In

Out

Loan in

Loan out

First team

Pre-season and friendlies
Mumbai City FC arranged a 10-day pre-season training camp in Pune where they used the facilities of DSK Shivajians before flying off to Valencia, Spain for rest of the preseason. In Spain, Mumbai City FC played friendly against Spanish third division sides UE Gandía, CD Castellón, CD Alcoyano, UD Alzira, Levante UD B, Elche CF B and Torre Levante CF.

Competitions

Indian Super League

Summary

November
Mumbai City started their season against ISL debutants Bengaluru on 19 November 2017 in their first away game of the season at the Sree Kanteerava Stadium in Bengaluru. The game began with a lot of physicality from both teams with tackles flying in from both sides. As the match progressed, Bengaluru started showing more flair and came close to opening their account thrice in the span of six minutes. Bengaluru kept seeing more of the ball and while there were a lot of moves that could have potentially ended up in goal, the final pass in the attacking-third seemed to let them down. Consequently, the sides went into the break with the score-line goalless. In the second half, Bengaluru scored their first goal in ISL, courtesy a short corner routine, when Edu García drilled one past former BFC man Amrinder Singh at the near post at the 67th minute. A defensive mix up between Wadoo and Amrinder in added time meant that Chhetri could get his name on the scoresheet and sealed a 2–0 victory for Bengaluru. Mumbai City got their campaign up and running in their first home game of the season with a narrow 2-1 win over Goa at the Mumbai Football Arena on 25 November 2017. Everton Santos made the most of a lapse by Laxmikant Kattimani to open the scoring, while Manuel Arana came up with the equaliser for Goa four minutes before Thiago Santos came in from the right flank and squeezed the ball through Kattimani's legs to score the winner for the Islanders. Mumbai City next faced Pune City in the first 'Maha' derby of the season on 29 November 2017. Pune City used their South American connection to good effect to come from behind and edge Mumbai City FC 2-1 at the Shree Shiv Chhatrapati Sports Complex in Pune. Uruguayan Emiliano Alfaro bagged a brace in the second half after the home team had gone behind from a sublime Balwant Singh strike in the first.

December
Mumbai City started the month with an away encounter against previous season runners up Kerala Blasters on 3 December 2017. Mark Sifneos’ goal in the first half, which was also Kerala's first of the season, was cancelled out by Balwant Singh's strike in the second. C.K. Vineeth was booked a second time in the 90th minute following a tussle with Balwant, and was consequently given his marching orders. The match ended in a 1–1 draw. After a poor start to the season with 1 win, 1 draw and 2 losses, Mumbai City next faced Chennaiyin, who were on a 3 match winning run on 10 December 2017. Mumbai were awarded a penalty after Balwant Singh was brought down in the box. Emana stepped up to the spot and slotted the ball into the bottom left corner to make it 1-0 for the Islanders, thus scoring the only goal of the game and breaking Chennaiyin's winning streak and securing their 2nd win of the season. Mumbai City then hosted previous seasons' champion ATK on 17 December, who were still winless this season. Amrinder made a couple of good saves to deny ATK a goal. His and Mumbai's resistance finally came to an end in the 54th minute when Zequinha hit a shot with the outside of his right foot from the left flank. The keeper was unsighted by Robin, who got a slight touch on the ball to help it through Amrinder's legs and into the net. Mumbai then won an away game against NorthEast United on 20 December, after Balwant scored a brace by scoring on either sides of half-time to ensure a 2-0 win for the Islanders. In their last game of the year 2017, Mumbai City routed Delhi Dynamos, courtesy a 4–0 scoreline at the Mumbai Football Arena. Lucian Goian and Everton Santos struck in the first half to give Mumbai City a 2 goal cushion. The half, however, ended on a sour note as a tussle between Mumbai's Sehnaj Singh and Delhi's Mirabaje earned both a straight red. The second half started with 20 players on the pitch and it took only four minutes for the home team to score their third. Eleven minutes from time, Emana found Balwant with a lovely chip, who chested the ball down and hit a scuffed shot off his calf, that wrong-footed Arnab to roll over the goal-line, thus adding a fourth goal to Delhi's misery.

January
Mumbai started the year with an away draw against Jamshedpur. A brace from Thiago Santos ensured that Mumbai will end the first part of their season on the fourth place. Though Mumbai had a good first half of the season, they were not able to replicate that form in the second half of the season after they suffered consecutive defeats against Kerala Balsters and Bengaluru. The only win in the month came against a 10 man Goa, when Balwant scored an all important 4th goal in the 86th minute in a 7 goal thriller.

February
Like previous months of the season, Mumbai were not able to win the opening encounter of the month, as they lost 2–1 to the ISL debutants Jamshedpur in a home encounter. They then lost their 2nd 'Maha' derby of the season when Diego Carlos and Marcelinho scored a goal in each half to end the match with a 2-0 scoreline. With thi defeat Mumbai's poor run at home continued with their fourth home loss on the trot. As things stood Mumbai needed a string of wins in the remainder of the league season. Mumbai then recorded 2 consecutive wins in the league when they defeated ATK away and NorthEast United on home, courtesy of a late Goian winner, thus keeping their playoff hopes alive. With two games in hand, Mumbai needed victories in both to stand a chance of making the playoffs. They played their next match against bottom placed Delhi Dynamos. Delhi started with a barrage of attacks and took the lead from a simple build-up play as early as in the sixth minute. Mumbai then tried to surge forward in search of the equaliser and got themselves a free-kick on the half-hour mark from just outside the box. Emana stepped up to take it, but his effort deflected off the wall and just over the target for a corner. At half time the scoreline read 1-0 in favour of Delhi. Mumbai started strong in the second half after they equalised just four minutes following the restart. Balwant received the ball on the left side, cut in and fired on goal. Xabi Irureta got down to make the save, but the rebound fell straight to Everton, who pounced to slot it home. Delhi then racked up 4 goals in the last quarter of an hour to play. Chhangte rounded off Amrinder and scored into an empty net. Mumbai could not make the playoffs with the 5-1 rout.

March
Mumbai then played their last match of the season against an already qualified Chennaiyin. The match ended 1–0 in favour of Chennaiyin.

Matches

Table

Results summary

Results by matchday

Super Cup

Qualification round
As one of the bottom four teams in Indian Super League, Mumbai City entered the Super Cup in the qualifier round where they faced Indian Arrows for a spot in the Round of 16. The match began with Mumbai on the front foot as expected. Leo Costa and Balwant Singh had early opportunities, while Everton came the nearest to scoring when his powerful shot from distance rebounded off the far post. In the second half, the Arrows kept thronging Mumbai's box with well-strung passes and eventually got rewarded in the 77th minute, when Rahul scored an amazing opener. He brilliantly dinked the ball over Goian, raced past him and lodged the ball past Amrinder to take the lead. However, on the 90th minute mark, they ended up giving away a penalty to Mumbai when Rai brought Everton down in the box and Emana made no mistake to convert it from the spot. That proved to be the last piece of action from regulation time as the match entered extra-time. In the first period of the extra time Everton then gave Mumbai the lead with a powerful shot from the edge of the box to enter the last 15 minutes with a one-goal advantage. With that, Mumbai sealed their berth in the pre-quarter finals by winning the match 2–1.

Round of 16
In the round of 16, Mumbai City will meet I-League side, East Bengal F.C.

Player statistics

List of squad players, including number of appearances by competition

|}

Top scorers

Source: soccerway
Updated: 16 March 2018

Clean sheets

Source: soccerway
Updated: 16 March 2018

Disciplinary record

Source: soccerway
Updated: 16 March 2018

See also
 2017–18 in Indian football
 2017–18 Indian Super League season

References

External links

Mumbai City FC seasons
Mumbai City